The 1914–15 Maltese First Division was the fifth edition Maltese First Division. This was won for the first time by Valletta United.

League table

Results

See also 
 1914 in association football
 1915 in association football

1914-15
Malta
1914 in Malta
1915 in Malta